Titi Essomba (born 2 January 1981 in Yaoundé, Cameroon) is a Cameroonian footballer who plays for AC Oulu. He has previously plied his trade for club teams in Finland and Kazakhstan.

Career
In April 2014, Essomba resigned with AC Oulu, after six-years away from the club, on a one-year contract.

References

1986 births
Living people
Cameroonian footballers
Cameroonian expatriate footballers
Veikkausliiga players
Kazakhstan Premier League players
AC Oulu players
Rovaniemen Palloseura players
FC Taraz players
FC Aktobe players
FC Irtysh Pavlodar players
Expatriate footballers in Kazakhstan
Expatriate footballers in Finland
Association football forwards
AC Kajaani players
Oulun Palloseura players
Oulun Työväen Palloilijat players